is a railway station in the city of  Nikaho, Akita, Japan, operated by JR East.

Lines
Kamihama Station is served by the Uetsu Main Line, and is located 198.5 km from the terminus of the line at Niitsu Station.

Station layout
The station consists of two opposed side platforms  connected to the station building by a footbridge. The station is unattended.

Platforms

History
Kamihama Station opened on March 1, 1952 as a station on the JNR (Japan National Railway). With the privatization of the JNR on April 1, 1987, the station came under the control of the East Japan Railway Company.

Passenger statistics
In fiscal 2014, the station was used by an average of 18 passengers daily (boarding passengers only).

Surrounding area

References

External links

 JR East Station information 

Railway stations in Japan opened in 1952
Railway stations in Akita Prefecture
Uetsu Main Line
Nikaho, Akita